The Synod of Hippo refers to the synod of 393 which was hosted in Hippo Regius in northern Africa during the early Christian Church. Additional synods were held in 394, 397, 401 and 426. Some were attended by Augustine of Hippo.

The synod of 393 is best known for two distinct acts. First, for the first time a council of bishops listed and approved a Christian Biblical canon that corresponds closely to the modern Catholic canon while falling short of the Eastern Orthodox canon. The canon list approved at Hippo included six books later classed by Catholics as deuterocanonical books and by Protestants as Apocrypha; but also included, as 'two books of Ezra', the Old Latin books First Ezra and Second Ezra, of which only the latter would subsequently be found in the Catholic canon. The canon list was later approved at the Council of Carthage (397) pending ratification by the "Church across the sea", that is, the See of Rome. Previous councils had approved similar, but slightly different, canons.

The council also reaffirmed the apostolic origin of the requirement of clerical continence and reasserted it as a requirement for all the ordained, in addition requiring that all members of a person's household must be Christian before that person can be ordained. Rules regarding clerical succession were also clarified at the synod, as well as certain liturgical considerations.

Canonical scriptures 
The canonical scriptures are listed in Canon xxxvi as follows:

The "five books of Solomon", according to Augustine, were Proverbs, Ecclesiastes, Song of Songs, Wisdom of Solomon, and Ecclesiasticus.

In the De doctrina christiana, Augustine explains the relation between the two books of Ezra/Esdras and its separation with the Chronicles (partly included in the Septuagint's 1 Esdras): "... and the two of Ezra, which last look more like a sequel to the continuous regular history which terminates with the books of Kings and Chronicles."

Notes 

Hippo
Hippo
393
390s in the Roman Empire
Development of the Christian biblical canon
Annaba